The 2014–15 Adelaide United FC season was the club's 11th season since its establishment in 2003. The club participated in the A-League for the 10th time and the FFA Cup for the first time.

Players

Squad information

From youth squad

Transfers in

Transfers out

Technical staff

Statistics

Squad statistics

Pre-season and friendlies

Competitions

Overall

A-League

League table

Results summary

Results by round

Matches

Finals series

FFA Cup

Awards
 NAB Young Footballer of the Month (December) – James Jeggo

References

External links
 Official Website

Adelaide United
Adelaide United FC seasons